Rushton is a civil parish in Cheshire West and Chester, England.  It contains 22 buildings that are recorded in the National Heritage List for England as designated listed buildings, all of which are listed at Grade II. This grade is the lowest of the three gradings given to listed buildings and is applied to "buildings of national importance and special interest".  Other than the village of Eaton, and the settlement of Rushton, the parish is entirely rural, which is reflected in its listed buildings.  Most of these are related to farming, or are domestic.  The other structures include a smithy, a village cross, a ruined stone structure, a former watermill, and a well.

See also
Listed buildings in Alpraham
Listed buildings in Clotton Hoofield
Listed buildings in Little Budworth
Listed buildings in Tiverton
Listed buildings in Tilstone Fearnall
Listed buildings in Utkinton

References

Listed buildings in Cheshire West and Chester
Lists of listed buildings in Cheshire